David B. Brunner (March 7, 1835 – November 29, 1903) was a Democratic member of the U.S. House of Representatives from Pennsylvania.

Biography
David B. Brunner was born in Amity, Pennsylvania. He attended the common schools and learned the carpenter’s trade. He taught school from 1853 to 1856, during which time he studied the classics. He graduated from Dickinson College in Carlisle, Pennsylvania, in 1860. He served as principal of the Reading Classical Academy in Reading, Pennsylvania, from 1860 to 1869. He established the Reading Business College in 1880.

Brunner was elected as a Democrat to the Fifty-first and Fifty-second Congresses. He was not a candidate for renomination in 1892. He taught at the Reading Business College and died in Reading in 1903 and was interred in Amityville Cemetery. Brunner was also the author of several Pennsylvania German poems, including  "Wann ich yuscht en Bauer waer" ("If only I were a farmer").

References

Sources

The Political Graveyard

1835 births
1903 deaths
Politicians from Reading, Pennsylvania
Democratic Party members of the United States House of Representatives from Pennsylvania
Dickinson College alumni
19th-century American politicians